The 1991 Prix de l'Arc de Triomphe was a horse race held at Longchamp on Sunday 6 October 1991. It was the 70th running of the Prix de l'Arc de Triomphe.

The winner was Suave Dancer, a three-year-old colt trained in France by John Hammond. The winning jockey was Cash Asmussen.

Race details
 Sponsor: CIGA Hotels
 Purse: 8,500,000 F; First prize: 5,000,000 F
 Going: Good to Soft
 Distance: 2,400 metres
 Number of runners: 14
 Winner's time: 2m 31.4s

Full result

 Abbreviations: nse = nose; hd = head

Winner's details
Further details of the winner, Suave Dancer.
 Sex: Colt
 Foaled: 7 February 1988
 Country: United States
 Sire: Green Dancer; Dam: Suavite (Alleged)
 Owner: Henri Chalhoub
 Breeder: Lillie Webb

References

External links
 Colour Chart – Arc 1991

Prix de l'Arc de Triomphe
 1991
1991 in Paris
October 1991 sports events in Europe